Vitta is a genus of brackish water and freshwater snails, an aquatic gastropod mollusks in the subfamily Neritininae of the family Neritidae, the nerites.

Species
Species within the genus Vitta include:
 Vitta adansoniana (Récluz, 1841)
 Vitta clenchi (Russell, 1940)
 Vitta consobrina Eichhorst, 2016
 Vitta cristata (Morelet, 1864)
 †Vitta duchasteli (Deshayes, 1832) 
 Vitta glabrata (G. B. Sowerby II, 1849)
 Vitta kuramoensis (Yoloye & Adegoke, 1977)
 Vitta luteofasciata (K. Miller, 1879)
 Vitta meleagris (Lamarck, 1822)
 Vitta moquiniana (Récluz, 1850)
 †Vitta pachii (Handmann, 1889) 
 Vitta perottetiana (Récluz, 1841)
 †Vitta picta (Férussac, 1823) 
 Vitta piratica (Russell, 1940)
 Vitta rubricata (Morelet, 1858)
 †Vitta rumeliana Harzhauser, Mandic, Büyükmeriç, Neubauer, Kadolsky & Landau, 2016 
 †Vitta schlickumi (Kowalke & Reichenbacher, 2005) 
 †Vitta sparsilineata (Dall, 1913) 
 Vitta usnea (Röding, 1798)
 Vitta virginea (Linnaeus, 1758)
 Vitta zebra (Bruguière, 1792)

References

 Harzhauser, M., Kowalke, T. (2001). Early Miocene brackish-water Mollusca from the Eastern Mediterranean and from the Central Paratethys - a faunistic and ecological comparison by selected faunas. Journal of the Czech Geological Survey. 46 (3-4), 353–374.page(s): 355-356
 Eichhorst T.E. (2016). Neritidae of the world. Volume 2. Harxheim: Conchbooks. Pp. 696–1366.

External links

 Mörch, O. A. L. (1852-1853). Catalogus conchyliorum quae reliquit D. Alphonso d'Aguirra & Gadea Comes de Yoldi, Regis Daniae Cubiculariorum Princeps, Ordinis Dannebrogici in Prima Classe & Ordinis Caroli Tertii Eques. Fasc. 1, Cephalophora, 170 pp. (1852); Fasc. 2, Acephala, Annulata, Cirripedia, Echinodermata, 74 (+2) pp. (1853). Hafniae (Copenhagen): L. Klein

Neritidae
Gastropod genera